Tom Barley (born 9 March 1987) is a British racing driver. In 2013, Barley competed in the British Touring Car Championship for the first time at Brands Hatch, driving for Team HARD in a Vauxhall Insignia NGTC.

Racing record

Complete British Touring Car Championship results
(key) Races in bold indicate pole position (1 point awarded – 2001–2002 all races, 2003–present just for first race, 2001 in class) Races in italics indicate fastest lap (1 point awarded all races, 2001 in class) * signifies that driver lead race for at least one lap (1 point given – 2001–2002 just for feature race, 2003–present all races, 2001 in class)

References

1987 births
Living people
British racing drivers
British Touring Car Championship drivers
Britcar drivers
Ginetta GT4 Supercup drivers